Krum Lovkov (born on 19 December 1988) is a Bulgarian footballer currently playing for Brestnik 1948. Lovkov is a defensive midfielder.

2006 and later years
On 2006 the youth academy midfielder Krum Lovkov agreed to the conditions of his first professional contract with CSKA Sofia which was to be effective for three years. He has also played for Rilski Sportist and Vihren Sandanski.

References

External links
 footmercato profile

Bulgarian footballers
1988 births
Living people
PFC CSKA Sofia players
OFC Vihren Sandanski players
First Professional Football League (Bulgaria) players

Association football defenders